Murray Chass (born October 12, 1938, Pittsburgh, Pennsylvania)  is an American baseball blogger. He previously wrote for The New York Times and before that the Associated Press on baseball and sports legal and labor relations. In 2003 the Baseball Writers' Association of America honored him with the J. G. Taylor Spink Award where he is honored in Cooperstown, NY in the National Baseball Hall of Fame and Museum. He took a buyout from the Times, along with Supreme Court writer Linda Greenhouse and dozens of others, in April 2008.

Chass graduated from the University of Pittsburgh in 1960 with a bachelor's degree in political science where he was a writer and editor for the Pitt News. In 1956 he "audaciously" made an appointment with the editor of the Pittsburgh Post-Gazette to pursue his "future of a newspaperman". He joined the Baseball Writers' Association of America in 1962, when he worked for the Associated Press in Pittsburgh. He joined the New York Times in 1969, and started covering the New York Yankees the following year. In 1986, he was made the paper's national baseball writer. Chass was also inducted into the International Jewish Sports Hall of Fame in 2013 and the Western Pennsylvania Jewish Sports Hall of Fame in Pittsburgh in 2004.

From 1979–1980 he served as chairman of the New York chapter of the Baseball Writers' Association of America. Chass has authored numerous books on the business, labor and legal relations of sports, baseball in particular, among his works: The Yankees: The Four Fabulous Eras of Baseball's Most Famous Team, which was published by Random House in 1979; Power Football, published by Dutton in 1973, and Pittsburgh Steelers: The Long Climb, published by Prentice Hall in 1973. He has contributed to Great Pro Football Games and Greatest Basketball Games. He also authored several articles in Dutton's Best Sports Stories series.

During his nearly 40 years writing for The New York Times, Chass covered the entirety of the George Steinbrenner regime, covering the Yankees daily until the end of the 1986 season. 

Chass made some other significant contributions to baseball writing. For one, he created the coverage of contracts. Salaries in sports had been largely guess work before he began reporting contracts of baseball's free agents once free agency began in 1976. For another, he pioneered the intensive coverage of baseball labor negotiations, later covering labor matters in the other three major sports as well.

Chass was one of the early authors of a Sunday baseball notebook and was unique in writing the notebook throughout the year, not just during the baseball season. From August 1984, through March 2008 he wrote 1,155 Sunday notebooks, developing more than 4,000 items ranging in length from one paragraph to more than 1,000 words.

In January 2004 he switched from reporting baseball news to writing baseball columns, writing from two to five columns a week.

Chass is a noted baseball traditionalist who laments the shift in baseball news coverage from daily beat-report biographies to more statistics-driven analysis like sabermetrics. In 2007, Chass asserted that, among "certain topics that should be off-limits," are "statistics mongers promoting VORP and other new-age baseball statistics." Chass particularly believes that in "their attempt to introduce these new-age statistics into the game," these "statistics mongers" threaten "to undermine most fans' enjoyment of baseball and the human factor therein." Baseball Prospectus editor Nate Silver published an open letter responding to Chass' comments.

In 2008, Chass started a blog, "Murray Chass on Baseball" where he has written nearly 1,000 columns similar to what he has written for The New York Times.

Chass is a voter for the Baseball Hall of Fame, and turned in a blank ballot for the 2017 HOF class and 2022 HOF class.

References

Further reading
 This chapter in Ruttman's history, based on a November 17, 2009 interview with Chass conducted for the book, discusses Chass's American, Jewish, baseball, and life experiences from youth to the present.

External links
 Murray Chass on Baseball
 2003 J.G. Taylor Spink Award Winner Murray Chass, Baseball Hall of Fame

Sportswriters from New York (state)
Baseball culture
1938 births
Living people
The New York Times writers
University of Pittsburgh alumni
Writers from Pittsburgh
BBWAA Career Excellence Award recipients
Journalists from Pennsylvania
Taylor Allderdice High School alumni
Sportswriters from Pennsylvania